Dimitrios Petkakis (Greek: Δημήτριος Πετκάκης; born 1 August 1983) is a Greek footballer. He currently plays for Irinoupoli F.C. in A1 EPS Imathias.

Career
He started his career playing for Apollon Kalamarias F.C. and Veria F.C. In summer 2008 he moved to Kavala F.C. He scored his first goal against his former team Apollon Kalamarias F.C. in a 2–0 home win. He totally completed 32 appearances having scored 1 goal. In summer 2011 he moved to Panionios G.S.S. He stayed there for one whole season. He completed this season having made 21 appearances but he did not manage to score any goal in the league. In summer 2012 he moved to AEP Paphos. He completed 10 appearances. In winter 2013 he moved to Olympiakos Volou 1937 F.C. He made his debut against Asteras Tripolis F.C. He scored his first goal against Pierikos F.C. in a 4–1 home win. At the beginning of 2013/14 season he signed a one-year contract with Aiginiakos F.C.

External links
Dimitris Petkakis at epae.org 
 Dimitris Petkakis at Guardian Football

1983 births
Living people
Greek footballers
Footballers from Thessaloniki
Cypriot First Division players
Apollon Pontou FC players
Veria F.C. players
Kavala F.C. players
Panionios F.C. players
AEP Paphos FC players
Olympiacos Volos F.C. players
Greek expatriate footballers
Greek expatriate sportspeople in Cyprus
Expatriate footballers in Cyprus
Association football defenders